Thomas Kiely Gorman (August 30, 1892 – August 16, 1980) was an American prelate of the Roman Catholic Church. He served as the first bishop of the new Diocese of Reno in Nevada from 1931 to 1952 and as the fourth bishop of the Diocese of Dallas in Texas from 1954 to 1969.

Biography

Early life 
Thomas Gorman was born on August 30, 1892, in Pasadena, California, to John Joseph and Mary Elizabeth (née Kiely) Gorman. He entered St. Patrick's Seminary in Menlo Park in 1910, shortly before his father's death. He was  transferred to St. Mary's Seminary, Baltimore, Maryland in 1914.

Priesthood 
Gorman was ordained to the priesthood for the Diocese of Monterey-Los Angeles on June 23, 1917. After his ordination, he went to Washington, D.C. to study at Catholic University of America for a year.  Gorman returned to California to perform and did pastoral work in the diocese until 1922. Gorman then traveled to Leuven, Belgium to attend the University of Louvain, graduating in 1925 with a Doctor of History degree. He returned to Los Angeles to become editor of Tidings, a diocesan newspaper in 1926.

Bishop of Reno 
On April 24, 1931, Gorman was appointed the first bishop of the new Diocese of Reno by Pope Pius XI. He received his episcopal consecration on July 22, 1931, from Archbishop John Cantwell, with Bishops John Mitty and Robert Armstrong serving as co-consecrators.

Under Gorman, the diocese opened soup kitchens and homeless shelters in Reno in the 1930s as a response to the Great Depression.  During World War II, he created USO centers for soldiers on leave, African-American wartime workers and residents in Boulder City, Nevada.

Coadjutor Bishop and Bishop of Dallas 
Gorman was named coadjutor bishop by Pope Pius XII of the Diocese of Dallas and titular bishop of Rhasus on February 8, 1952. He automatically succeeded Bishop Joseph Lynch as the fourth Bishop of Dallas upon the latter's death on August 29, 1954. John F. Kennedy, the first Roman Catholic to serve as President of the United States, was shot and killed in Dallas during Gorman's tenure. Gorman attended the Second Vatican Council in Rome from 1962 to 1965.

Despite his original support for their ecumenical work, Gorman relieved four Texan Paulist priests of their duties in 1967 for purportedly neglecting their responsibility of servicing the Newman Clubs at local colleges. His decision met widespread opposition, but he refused to reverse it.

Retirement and legacy 
On August 22, 1969, Pope Paul VI accepted Gorman's resignation as bishop of Dallas and named him titular bishop of Pinhel; he resigned from that title on January 21, 1971.

Thomas Gorman died in Dallas on August 16, 1980, at age 88.Bishop Thomas K. Gorman Catholic School in Tyler, Texas, is named after him.

References

1892 births
1980 deaths
20th-century Roman Catholic bishops in the United States
Saint Patrick's Seminary and University alumni
St. Mary's Seminary and University alumni
Catholic University of America alumni
Participants in the Second Vatican Council
Roman Catholic bishops of Reno
Roman Catholic Archdiocese of Los Angeles
Roman Catholic bishops of Dallas